Terminal debt is the point at which the payments on the interest of a debt surpass the revenues of the debtor (i.e. the debt becomes fiscally unstable.)

References

Debt